The 1985 Australian GT Championship was the eighth Australian GT Championship and the fourth to be decided over a series of races.  It was open to GT Cars complying with CAMS Group D regulations with Group B Sports Sedans and superseded Group C touring cars competing by invitation. The title was contested over six rounds from 24 March to 25 August 1985.  

This was the final season before the series would be cancelled. It would later be resurrected in 2005.

Schedule

Note : Rounds were run concurrently with those of the 1985 Australian Sports Car Championship.

Results
For rounds contested over a single race, i.e. Rounds 1, 4, 5 & 6, championship points were awarded on a 30-27-24-21-19-17-15-14-13-12-11-10-9-8-7-6-5-4-3-2 basis to the top twenty finishers in the round.  

For rounds contested over two races, i.e. Rounds 2 & 3, championship points were awarded by allocating race points on a 30-27-24-21-19-17-15-14-13-12-11-10-9-8-7-6-5-4-3-2 basis to the top twenty finishers in each race, aggregating the points from the two races and then dividing the result by two. (Race points allocated for these races are shown in the table below within brackets)

References

Australian Motor Racing Yearbook, 1985/86
CAMS Manual of Motor Sport, 1985
Official Programme, Adelaide International Raceway, 30 June 1985

External links
www.camsmanual.com.au

Australian GT Championship
GT Championship